Jane Archer may refer to:

Jane Archer (security official) (1898–1982), married name of Jane Sissmore, MI5 and SIS security official
 Jane Archer (writer), pseudonym of Nina Romberg
Jane Archer, character in The Age of Innocence (1934 film)